National Highway 166G, commonly referred to as NH 166G is a national highway in India. It is a secondary route of National Highway 66.  NH-166G runs in the state of Maharashtra in India.

Route 
NH166G connects Talera, Vaibhavawadi, Gaganbawada (Bavda), Kale and Kolhapur in the state of Maharashtra.

Junctions  
 
  Terminal near Talera.
  Terminal near Kolhapur.

See also 
 List of National Highways in India
 List of National Highways in India by state

References

External links 

 NH 166G on OpenStreetMap

National highways in India
National Highways in Maharashtra